The Oji-Cree are a First Nation in the Canadian provinces of Ontario and Manitoba, residing in a narrow band extending from the Missinaibi River region in Northeastern Ontario at the east to Lake Winnipeg at the west.

The Oji-Cree people are descended from historical intermarriage between the Ojibwa and Cree cultures, but are generally considered a nation distinct from either of their ancestral groups. They are considered one of the component groups of Anishinaabe, and reside primarily in a transitional zone between traditional Ojibwa lands to their south and traditional Cree lands to their north. Historically, the Oji-Cree were identified by the British and Canadian governments as "Cree." The Oji-Cree have identified with the Cree (or more specifically, the Swampy Cree) and not with the Ojibwa located to the south of them. Traditionally, they were called Noopiming-ininiwag (People in the Woods) by the Ojibwe. Oji-Cree at Round Lake First Nation were known as Ajijaakoons (little cranes), due to their chief's name, Ajijaak. The Oji-Cree identify by the autonym Anishinaabe or Anishinini (Original Human).

Their language and culture also derive from mixed Ojibwa and Cree traditions. Anishininimowin (the Oji-Cree language) is more closely related to Ojibwa structurally, although its literary tradition more closely resembles that of Cree. Anishinaabemowin has about 12,600 speakers.

Oji-Cree bands 
 Severn River Cree (historical)
 Big Trout Lake Band of Cree (historical)
 Bearskin Lake First Nation – Bearskin Lake Reserve
 Kitchenuhmaykoosib Inninuwug First Nation – Kitchenuhmaykoosib Aaki 84 Reserve
 Muskrat Dam Lake First Nation – Muskrat Dam Lake Reserve
 Sachigo Lake First Nation – Sachigo Lake 1 Reserve, Sachigo Lake 2 Reserve, Sachigo Lake 3 Reserve
 Deer Lake Band of Cree (historical)
 Deer Lake First Nation – Deer Lake Reserve
 Keewaywin First Nation – Kee-Way-Win Indian Settlement, Keewaywin Reserve
 Koocheching First Nation – 
 McDowell Lake First Nation – MacDowell Lake Indian Settlement
 North Spirit Lake First Nation – North Spirit Lake Reserve
 Sandy Lake First Nation – Sandy Lake 88 Reserve
 Island Lake Band of Cree (historical)
 Garden Hill First Nation – Garden Hill First Nation Reserve, Amik Wachink Sakahikan Indian Reserve, Wesha Kijay Wasagamach Indian Reserve, Seeseep Sakahikan Indian Reserve, Pe-ta-waygamak Indian Reserve
 Red Sucker Lake First Nation – Red Sucker Lake 1976 Reserve
 St. Theresa Point First Nation – St. Theresa Point Indian Reserve, Mukwa Narrows Indian Reserve, Cantin Lake Indian Reserve
 Wasagamack First Nation – Wasagamack Indian Reserve, Feather Rapids Indian Reserve, Naytawunkank Indian Reserve
 Upland Ojibway (historical)
 Osnaburgh House Band of Ojibway (historical)
 Cat Lake First Nation – Cat Lake 63C Reserve
 Mishkeegogamang First Nation (formerly known as New Osnaburgh House Band of Ojibway) – Osnaburgh 63A Reserve, Osnaburgh 63B Reserve
 Slate Falls First Nation – Slate Falls Indian Settlement
 Ojibway Nation of Saugeen First Nation – Ojibway Nation of Saugeen Reserve
 Fort Hope Band of Ojibway or Cree (historical)
 Aroland First Nation – Aroland Indian Settlement
 Constance Lake First Nation –
 Eabametoong First Nation (also known as Fort Hope First Nation) – Fort Hope 64 Reserve
 Marten Falls First Nation – Marten Falls 65 Reserve
 Neskantaga First Nation (formerly Lansdowne House First Nation) – Summer Beaver Settlement, Neskantaga Reserve
 Nibinamik First Nation (also known as Summer Beaver First Nation – Summer Beaver Settlement
 Whitewater First Nation –
 Winisk River Cree (historical)
 Caribou Lake Band of Cree (Historical)
 Kasabonika Lake First Nation (ᑳᓭᐹᓇᐦᑳ ᓂᐢᑕᒼ ᐊᓂᐦᓯᓂᓂᐗᐠ (Gaa-zebaanikaa Nistam Anisininiwag); unpointed: ᑲᓭᐸᓂᑲ ᓂᐢᑕᒼ ᐊᓂᓯᓂᓂᐗᐠ) – Kasabonika Lake Reserve
 Kingfisher First Nation – Kingfisher Lake 1 Reserve, Kingfisher 2A Reserve, Kingfisher 3A Reserve
 North Caribou Lake First Nation (also known as Weagamow Lake First Nation or Round Lake First Nation) – Weagamow Lake Indian Reserve 87
 Wapekeka First Nation (formerly Angling Lake First Nation) – Wapekeka Reserve 1, Wapekeka Reserve 2
 Wawakapewin First Nation (ᐙᐙᑲᐯᐎᐣ ᓂᐢᑕᒼ ᐊᓂᐦᔑᓂᓂᐗᐠ (Waawaagabewin Nistam Anishininiwag); unpointed: ᐗᐗᑲᐯᐎᐣ ᓂᐢᑕᒼ ᐊᓂᔑᓂᓂᐗᐠ) (formerly Nemeigusabins Lake Band, Long Dog Lake Band or Long Dog Band) – Wawakapewin Indian Reserve
 Webequie First Nation – Webiqui Indian Settlement, Webequi Indian Reserve
 Wunnumin Lake First Nation – Wunnumin 1 Reserve, Wunnumin 2 Reserve

References

Further reading

 Favel, Fred. Northern Lights and Satellites Kenina Kakekayash, Oji-Cree, Director of Radio, Wawatay Radio Network. [Ottawa]: Indian and Northern Affairs Canada, 2001. 
 Long, John. Treaty No. 9: Making the Agreement to Share the Land in Far Northern Ontario in 1905. Kingston: McGill-Queen's University Press, 2010. 
 Macfie, John, and Basil Johnston. Hudson Bay Watershed A Photographic Memoir of the Ojibway, Cree, and Oji-Cree. Toronto: Dundurn Press, 1991. 
 Rogers, Edward S. and Garth Taylor. "Northern Ojibwa" in Handbook of North American Indians: Subarctic. William C. Sturtevant, editor. Government Printing Office, 1978. 
 Triggs-Raine BL, et al. 2002. "HNF-1alpha G319S, a Transactivation-Deficient Mutant, Is Associated with Altered Dynamics of Diabetes Onset in an Oji-Cree Community". Proceedings of the National Academy of Sciences of the United States of America. 99, no. 7: 4614–9.
 Valentine, Lisa Philips. "Making It Their Own /Severn Ojibwe Communicative Practices", Anthropological Horizons, 7. Toronto: University of Toronto Press, 1995. 
 Valentine, Lisa Philips. "Work to Create the Future You Want" Contemporary Discourse in a Severn Ojibwe Community. 1990.

 
Algonquian peoples